Bahrain Island ( Jazīrah al-Baḥrayn), also known as al-Awal Island and formerly as Bahrein, is the largest island within the archipelago of Bahrain, and forms the bulk of the country's land mass while hosting the majority of its population.

Geography
Most of the island of Bahrain is in a relatively shallow inlet of the Persian Gulf known as the Gulf of Bahrain. The seabed adjacent to Bahrain is rocky and, mainly off the northern part of the island, covered by extensive coral reefs. Most of the island is low-lying and barren desert. Outcroppings of limestone form low rolling hills, stubby cliffs, and shallow ravines. The limestone is covered by various densities of saline sand, capable of supporting only the hardiest desert vegetation such as chiefly thorn trees and scrubs. Most of the country's oil wells are situated in the vicinity of the mountain.

Climate
The climatic conditions of the area is arid. The average annual temperature in the area is 28 °C. The warmest month is August, when the average temperature is 38 °C and the coldest is January, with 18 °C. The average annual rainfall is 144 millimeters. The rainiest month is November, with an average of 38 mm of precipitation, and the driest is October, with 1 mm of precipitation.

Demography
Manama, the capital of the kingdom of Bahrain, is located on the northeastern tip of the Island of Bahrain. The main port, Mina Salman, is also located on the island, as are the major oil refining facilities and commercial centers.

Administration
The island is split between 3 of the Bahrain's Governorates.

Transportation
Causeways and bridges connect Bahrain to adjacent islands and the mainland of Saudi Arabia. The oldest causeway, originally constructed in 1929, links Bahrain to Al Muharraq, the third largest island. 
There are three causeways connecting Muharraq Island with Manama on Bahrain Island:
 Shaikh Hamad Bridge: From Muharraq City to Diplomatic Area
 Shaikh Isa bin Salman Causeway: From Muharraq City/Busaiteen to Diplomatic Area
 Shaikh Khalifa Bridge: From Hidd to Juffair
At its eastern shore is lying Sitrah, site of the oil export terminal, which is linked to Bahrain by a bridge that spans the narrow channel separating the two islands. 
At its western shore, a causeway to the island of Umm an Nasan, continues on to the Saudi mainland town of Al Khubar through the King Fahd Causeway. Umm an Nasan is the private property of the king and the site of his personal game preserve.

Gallery

Notes

References 

 
 

Islands of Bahrain
Islands of the Persian Gulf